Fellowship of the Institution of Mechanical Engineers (FIMechE)  is an award and fellowship granted to individuals that the Institution of Mechanical Engineers  judges to be a "professional engineer working in a senior role with significant autonomy and responsibility." It is the highest level of membership and demonstrates experience, commitment and contribution to engineering.

Fellowship
Fellows are entitled to use the post-nominal letters FIMechE.  examples of fellows include Colin P. Smith, Barry Thornton, William Pillar, Laurence Williams and Michael Alcock.  See the :Category:Fellows of the Institution of Mechanical Engineers for more examples.

References

Institution of Mechanical Engineers
Academic awards
 
Institution of Mechanical Engineers